The following lists events that happened during 1988 in Chile.

Incumbents
President of Chile: Augusto Pinochet

Events

October
5 October – 1988 Chilean national plebiscite

Births
7 December – Juan Abarca

Deaths
12 July – Germán Picó Cañas (b. 1905)
22 October – René Rojas Galdames (b. 1919)

References 

 
Years of the 20th century in Chile
Chile